The 2nd Alpini Regiment is a regiment of the Italian Army's mountain infantry speciality, the Alpini, which distinguished itself in combat during World War I and World War II. The regiment was disbanded in 1943 due to losses on the Eastern Front, however one of its component battalions, the Alpini Battalion "Saluzzo", was reformed in November 1945 after the end of hostilities in Europe. The regiment itself was reformed in 1963 as a training unit, but during the 1975 army reform it was reduced to battalion. In 1992 the regiment was raised once again and today it consists of the Alpini Battalion "Saluzzo", is based in Cuneo and part of the Alpine Brigade "Taurinense".

History

1882 – 1914 
The 2nd Alpini Regiment was formed on 1 November 1882 in Bra. It consisted of the three battalions: "Val Pesio", "Col Tenda", and "Val Schio"; in 1887 the battalions were renamed, taking their new names from the location of their logistic depot: "Borgo San Dalmazzo", "Vinadio" (in 1904 renamed "Dronero") and "Dronero" (in 1904 renamed "Saluzzo").

Alpine troops (including units from the 2nd Alpini Regiment) formed the 2nd Company of the Formation Battalion in the First Italo-Ethiopian War.

In 1901 the 2nd Alpini Regiment moved to Cuneo; the following year it formed, together with the 1st Alpini Regiment, the I Alpini Group.

After the 1905 Calabria earthquake the 2nd Regiment sent the sapper platoons of its battalions to aid in the rescue efforts. After the 1908 Messina earthquake the regiment deployed 120 sappers.

On 9 August 1910, the 2nd Alpini Regiment joined the 1st Alpine Brigade. As of 1910 the Regiment consisted of the battalions "Borgo San Dalmazzo", "Dronero", and "Saluzzo". The latter saw the regiment's first action in the Italo-Turkish War of 1911, fighting Ottoman forces in Libya. In 1913 the battalion returned to Italy.

World War I

During World War I the regiment consisted of ten battalions and saw heavy fighting in the Alps regions of the Italian front against Austro-Hungarian and German forces. During the war the regiment consisted of the following battalions (pre-war battalions in bold, followed by their first and second line reserve battalions):

  Borgo San Dalmazzo, Val Stura, Monte Argentera, Cuneo
  Dronero, Val Maira, Bicocca
  Saluzzo, Val Varaita, Monte Viso

During the Battle of Caporetto in October 1917 and the following retreat to the Piave river the regiment suffered extreme losses and the battalions Val Stura, Monte Argentera, Bicocca, and Monte Viso had to be disbanded in November and December 1917. During the war 151 officers and 3,442 soldiers of the regiment were killed, and 308 officers and 5,498 soldiers were wounded. The regiment's battalions were awarded three Silver Medals of Military Valour during the war, one of which was shared between the Val Maira, Val Varaita, Monte Argentera, and Monviso battalions.

Interwar years 
In late August 1919, three Battalions of the 2nd Regiment were deployed to Albania against a local insurgency as part of two Alpine Groups: the 2nd Alpine Group included battalions "Dronero" and "Saluzzo"; the 14th Alpine Group included the Battalion "Borgo San Dalmazzo". Both Groups were repatriated, in 1920. From December 1920 to January 1921 the battalion "Dronero" and "Saluzzo" were part of the 2nd Alpine Group assigned to the 45th Division in the campaign against the Italian Regency of Carnaro.

During the 1921 Royal Italian Army reform, the 2nd Alpini Regiment transferred the battalions "Dronero" and "Saluzzo" to the 1st Alpini Regiment, which transferred the battalions "Ceva" and "Mondovì" to the 2nd Alpini Regiment. Both regiments were assigned to the 1st Alpine Division, which was renamed 1st Alpine Group in 1923 and then 1st Alpine Brigade in 1926.

In 1923 the battalions "Dronero" and "Saluzzo" returned to the 2nd Alpini Regiment and the battalions "Ceva" and "Mondovì" returned to the 1st Alpini Regiment. In 1933 the 1st Alpine Brigade was renamed 4th Alpine Brigade, and in 1934 it became the IV Higher Alpine Command "Cuneense".

In September 1935 the Battalion "Saluzzo" was transferred to the 11th Alpini Regiment of the 5th Alpine Division "Pusteria"; the battalion was replaced by the re-raised Battalion "Val Varaita".

On 31 October 1935 the IV Higher Alpine Command "Cuneense" was reorganized as 4th Alpine Division "Cuneense", with the 1st Alpini Regiment, 2nd Alpini Regiment, and 4th Mountain Artillery Regiment.

As part of the 5th Alpine Division "Pusteria" the "Saluzzo" fought in 1936 in the Second Italo-Abyssinian War. In April 1937 the "Saluzzo" returned to the 2nd Alpini Regiment and the Battalion "Val Varaita" was disbanded.

At the time the regiment consisted of 160 officers and 5,046 NCOs and soldiers for a total strength of 5,206 men. The regiment also had 23 horses, 1,242 mules and 109 transport vehicles at its disposal. The order of Battle was as follows:

  2nd Alpini Regiment, in Cuneo
 Command Company, in Cuneo
  Borgo San Dalmazzo Alpini Battalion, in Cuneo
 13th Alpini Company, in Cuneo
 14th Alpini Company, in Cuneo
 15th Alpini Company, in Cuneo
 104th Support Arms Company, in Cuneo
  Dronero Alpini Battalion, in Dronero
 17th Alpini Company, in Dronero
 18th Alpini Company, in San Damiano Macra
 19th Alpini Company, in Dronero
 105th Support Arms Company, in Dronero
  Saluzzo Alpini Battalion, in Vinadio
 21st Alpini Company, in Vinadio
 22nd Alpini Company, in Demonte
 23rd Alpini Company, in Demonte
 106th Support Arms Company, in Demonte
 14th 47/32 M35 Cannon Company, in Cuneo
 2nd Health Company, in Cuneo
 615th Field Hospital, in Dronero
 2nd Sanitary Support Company, in Dronero
 22nd Baggage Train Company, in Bene Vagienna

World War II 

When Italy entered World War II the regiment consisted of:
 prep-war units:
 Alpini Battalion "Borgo San Dalmazzo"
 Alpini Battalion "Dronero"
 Alpini Battalion "Saluzzo"
 2nd Medical Section
 615th Field Hospital
 22nd Support Section
 2nd Supply Section
 Mobilized units raised after September 1939:
 Alpini Battalion "Val Stura" (Western front)
 Alpini Battalion "Val Maira" (Western front)
 Alpini Battalion "Bicocca" (deployed to Corsica in 1943–1944)
 XIII Reserve Battalion (deployed to the Balkans 1941–1942)
 II Reserve Battalions (deployed to Russia, with the 4th Alpine Division "Cuneense")
 II Reserve Battalion bis (raised 1943 by the 8th Marching Division
 XXIX Reserve Battalion (1943, later renamed "Monte Ischiator")

On 21 June 1940 (one day before the French surrender) the Cuneense division began to advance with other Italian units into Southern France. The division was then sent to Albania, where it participated in the Italian attack on Greece. In April 1941 the German Wehrmacht came to the aid of the beaten Italian armies in Albania through an invasion of Yugoslavia and the Cuneense was sent north to aid the rapidly advancing German divisions, advancing through Montenegro and reaching Dubrovnik at the end of the campaign.

In September 1942 the Cuneense was sent with the 2nd Alpine Division "Tridentina", 3rd Alpine Division "Julia" and other Italian units to the Soviet Union to form the Italian Army in Russia ( abbreviated as ARMIR) and fight alongside the German Wehrmacht against the Red Army. Taking up positions along the Don River, the Italian units covered part of the left flank of the German Sixth Army, which spearheaded the German summer offensive of 1942 into the city of Stalingrad.

After successfully encircling the German Sixth army in Stalingrad the Red Army's attention turned to the Italian units along the Don. On 14 January 1943, the Soviet Operation Little Saturn began and the three alpine division found themselves quickly encircled by rapidly advancing armored Soviet Forces. The Alpini held the front on the Don, but within three days the Soviets had advanced 200 km to the left and right of the Alpini. On the evening of 17 January the commanding officer of the Italian Mountain Corps General Gabriele Nasci ordered a full retreat. At this point the Julia and Cuneense divisions were already heavily decimated and only the Tridentina division was still capable of conducting combat operations. As the Soviets had already occupied every village bitter battles had to be fought to clear the way out of the encirclement. By morning of 28 January the men of the 2nd Alpini Regiment had walked 200 km, fought in 20 battles and spent 11 nights camped out in the middle of the Steppe. Temperatures during the nights were between -30 °C and -40 °C. During the 28th the last remnants of the regiment were annihilated by Cossack forces.

On 11 February 1943, the survivors were counted and out of 5,206 men of the 2nd Alpini Regiment just 208 had survived; none of the soldiers of the battalions "Borgo San Dalmazzo" and "Saluzzo" had survived. The survivors were repatriated and after the signing of the Italian armistice with the Allies on 8 September 1943 the regiment was dissolved in Bolzano.

Cold War

After World War II the "Saluzzo" battalion was reformed on 23 November 1945 and assigned to the 4th Alpini Regiment. The battalion carried on the traditions of the 2nd Alpini Regiment.

The regiment itself was reformed on 1 July 1963 as a Recruits Training Centre with four battalions, which were named for the four alpine brigades to which the conscripts were sent after training: "Tridentina", "Orobica", "Cadore" and "Taurinense" battalions. 

During the 1975 army reform the army disbanded the regimental level and newly independent battalions were given for the first time their own flags. In preparation of the reform the 2nd Alpini Regiment (Recruits Training) was disbanded on 31 October 1974. On 10 October 1975 the 4th Alpini Regiment of the Alpine Brigade "Taurinense" was disbanded and on the same day the regiment's Alpini Battalion "Saluzzo" in Borgo San Dalmazzo was assigned the flag and traditions of the 2nd Alpini Regiment.

Current structure 

On 28 August 1992 the Alpini Battalion "Saluzzo" was elevated to 2nd Alpini Regiment without changing size or composition.

As of 2022 the 2nd Alpini Regiment is based in Cuneo and assigned to Alpine Brigade "Taurinense".

  Regimental Command
  Command and Logistic Support Company
  Alpini Battalion "Saluzzo"
  21st Alpini Company
  22nd Alpini Company
  23rd Alpini Company
  106th Maneuver Support Company

The Command and Logistic Support Company fields the following platoons: C3 Platoon, Transport and Materiel Platoon, Medical Platoon, and Commissariat Platoon.

Equipment 
The Alpini companies are equipped with Bv 206S tracked all-terrain carriers, Puma 6x6 wheeled armored personnel carriers and Lince light multirole vehicles. The maneuver support company is equipped with 120mm mortars and Spike MR anti-tank guided missiles.

Military honors 
After World War II the President of Italy awarded the 2nd Alpini Regiment Italy's highest military honor, the Gold Medal of Military Valour for the regiment's conduct and sacrifice during the Italian campaign on the Eastern Front:

  Italian campaign on the Eastern Front, awarded 3 March 1949

See also
 Alpine Brigade "Taurinense"
 Italian Army

Sources 
 Franco dell'Uomo, Rodolfo Puletti: L'Esercito Italiano verso il 2000 - Volume Primo - Tomo I, Rome 1998, Stato Maggiore dell'Esercito - Ufficio Storico, page: 456

References

External links 
 Official Homepage
 2nd Alpini Regiment on vecio.it

Alpini regiments of Italy
Regiments of Italy in World War I
Regiments of Italy in World War II
Military units and formations established in 1882
Military units and formations disestablished in 1943
Military units and formations established in 1963
Military units and formations disestablished in 1974
Military units and formations established in 1992